Anderson and Wise may refer to:
Anderson and Wise (musical duo) - a 1960s New Zealand musical act
Anderson and Wise (song) - a song by Anderson and Wise